The Men's 2001 World Amateur Boxing Championships were held in Belfast, Northern Ireland, from June 3 to June 10. The competition was organised by the world governing body for amateur boxing International Boxing Association (AIBA).

Medal winners

Medal table

External links
Results

World Amateur Boxing Championships
AIBA World Boxing Championships
2001
Sports competitions in Belfast
World Amateur Boxing Championships
Boxing in Northern Ireland
2000s in Northern Ireland
21st century in Belfast
2001
World Amateur Boxing Championships